Gobindapur may refer to several places:

India
 Gobindapur, Kolkata, one of the three villages that were merged to form Calcutta
 Govindpur, Allahabad
 Gobindapur, Bhangar, a census town in South 24 Parganas, West Bengal, India
 Gobindapur, Jaynagar

Bangladesh
 Arazi Gobindapur, a village in Jhalokati District, Bangladesh
 , Bangladesh

See also
 Govindpur (disambiguation)
 Govindapura (disambiguation)
 Govindapur (disambiguation)
 Gobindpur (disambiguation)